Blue Screen Life is the second album released by indie rock band Pinback. Ace Fu Records released the album in October 2001 in CD format, and a year later on vinyl.

Track listing

References

Pinback albums
2001 albums
Ace Fu Records albums